
Gmina Gnojnik is a rural gmina (administrative district) in Brzesko County, Lesser Poland Voivodeship, in southern Poland.

Villages
Gmina Gnojnik contains the villages and settlements of Biesiadki, Gnojnik, Gosprzydowa, Lewniowa, Uszew, Zawada Uszewska and Żerków.

Neighbouring gminas
Gmina Gnojnik is bordered by the gminas of Brzesko, Czchów, Dębno, Lipnica Murowana and Nowy Wiśnicz.

References
 Polish official population figures 2006

Gnojnik
Brzesko County